John L. Lively (born June 18, 1943 in Summers, Arkansas) is a retired American Thoroughbred horse racing jockey who won 3,468 career races, including the 1976 Preakness Stakes, as well as ten riding titles at Ak-Sar-Ben Racetrack in Omaha, Nebraska plus two at Oaklawn Park in Hot Springs, Arkansas and another at Remington Park in Oklahoma City, Oklahoma.

National prominence
Lively began his horse racing career aboard American Quarter Horses at small tracks in his native Oklahoma.
He had been riding for eleven years when he began receiving nationwide attention in 1979 for riding Elocutionist to victory in the Arkansas Derby for trainer Paul Adwell and owner Gene Cashman. Lively guided the colt to a third-place finish in the Kentucky Derby then two weeks later he and Elocutionist defeated both the Derby winner Bold Forbes and the 1975 American Champion Two-Year-Old Colt Honest Pleasure to win the second leg of the Triple Crown series, the Preakness Stakes. Swelling in Elocutionist's right front leg kept Lively and his horse out of the third leg of the Triple Crown series, the Belmont Stakes.

In 1981, history would nearly repeat itself for Lively when he won his second Arkansas Derby aboard Bold Ego but came just short of another win in the Preakness when he and Bold Ego finished second behind Pleasant Colony.

Racing honors
In 1990, Lively was voted the prestigious George Woolf Memorial Jockey Award given annually since 1950 to the Thoroughbred horse racing jockey in North America who demonstrates high standards of personal and professional conduct, on and off the racetrack. In 2011, Lively was inducted into the Oklahoma Horse Racing Hall of Fame at Remington Park.

Among his other racing accomplishments, on November 19, 1970 Lively rode five winners on a single racecard at Sportsman's Park Racetrack near Chicago. He retired from race riding after the 1991 meeting at Oaklawn Park to live on his farm near his hometown of Westville, Oklahoma.

Family
Lively's daughter Patrice was married to Hall of Fame jockey, Mike Smith.

References

1943 births
Living people
American jockeys
People from Westville, Oklahoma
Preakness Stakes